Hydnellum geogenium is a species of tooth fungus in the family Bankeraceae. It was described as new to science in 1852 by Elias Magnus Fries. Howard James Banker transferred it to the genus Hydnellum in 1913. The fungus is found in Europe and North America, where it grows in coniferous woods. It is inedible. H. geogenium is considered endangered in Switzerland. Fruitbodies of the fungus contain a yellow pigment compound called geogenin.

References

External links

Fungi described in 1852
Fungi of Europe
Fungi of North America
geogenium
Inedible fungi
Taxa named by Elias Magnus Fries